Pritam Kagne (born 29 August) is an Indian actress who appears in Bollywood, South Indian films and Marathi movies. Pritam Kagne recently appeared in India Today Magazine.

Career
Kagne made her debut in acting with Malayalam Film Mr Bean in (2013). She debuted in to Marathi films with Navra Maza Bhavra in (2013) And she has also acted in upcoming feature Bollywood film 31st October releasing in 2016.

She has also appeared in Marathi feature film Halal (2015) with director Shivaji Lotan Patil, Chinmay Mandlekar and Priyadarshan Jadhav, produced by Amol Kagne which was screened at the Cannes Film Festival and Goa Film Festival Pune International Film Festival and Godrej Film Festival

Filmography

Films

Drama
 Ajab Lagnachi Gajab Goshta
 Natsamrat

Halal 
Halal is the first Marathi film produced by Amol Kagne under the Amol Kagne Films banner. The film deals with the theme of loyalty, love and the institution of marriage that is deemed to be pious by society.  It is a story of human emotions, which depicts the trials and tribulations that women in our society have gone through. Halal (film) was screened at the Cannes and Goa Film Festivals.

Awards and nominations

References

External links 
 

Living people
Actresses from Pune
1988 births